Rio Grande (lit. "Great River") is a municipality (município) and one of the oldest cities in the Brazilian state of Rio Grande do Sul. It was the state capital from 1835 to 1845. It is the most important port city in the state and has one of the most important maritime ports in Brazil.

The city is named after a nearby channel which indirectly connects the Lagoa dos Patos, to the northeast, and Lagoa Mirim, to the west, with the Atlantic Ocean. The municipality is bordered by Santa Vitória do Palmar on the south and Pelotas on the north, which lies across the São Gonçalo Channel.

The city built up its wealth over the course of its long history of strong industrial movements. Today it is still one of the richest cities in Rio Grande do Sul, mainly because of its port, the second busiest in Brazil, and its refinery, which processes Ipiranga petroleum.

The city is served by Rio Grande Airport.

History

The history of Rio Grande is as old as the history of the whole region. It was explored by Portuguese sailors led by Martim Afonso de Sousa who sought fortified places along the southern Brazilian coast for a defense against the French corsairs. He discovered the tributary which indirectly connects the Lagoa dos Patos and Lagoa Mirim to the Atlantic Ocean and called the place Rio Grande de São Pedro (lit. "Large River of St. Peter").

In 1669, the Portuguese established a colony further down the South American coastline along the Río de la Plata, which they called Colônia do Sacramento. With the first permanent Portuguese settlement in the region, livestock was introduced and began to spread far and wide over the territory. With the new settlers, the Portuguese decided to make a church-sanctioned settlement and, in 1736, created the Freguesia de São Pedro which covered what is today all of Uruguay and Rio Grande do Sul.

The city of Rio Grande was founded in 1737 by Brigadier General José da Silva Pais and his men to defend Portugal's territory. The Jesus Maria e José Fort was constructed, which was built on the site of the future city. The fort was transformed into a town when colonists from the Azores and Madeira arrived in the 1750s. In 1751, the growing colony became the Village of Rio Grande de São Pedro. In 1760, Rio Grande de São Pedro, which was formerly governed from Santa Catarina became its own captaincy, a type of administrative division.

In 1763 the village was occupied by the Spanish. After constant disputes, Portugal reconquered the village in 1776, thanks to the actions of General Rafael Pinto Bandeira. However, when the fortress was taken by Spanish troops, many families fled to Viamão and established around its port the city of Porto Alegre.

During the Ragamuffin War, Rio Grande became a city and the province's capital all at once. In 1835, revolutionary General Bento Gonçalves da Silva forced Antônio Rodrigues Fernandes Braga, the provincial president, to flee from Porto Alegre to Rio Grande, a journey of about 200 km. The city remained the province's seat of government until the revolution's end in 1845.

Geography

Rio Grande, as the name suggests, is a littoral city, which boasts what many call the longest beach in the world — Praia do Cassino. Additionally, the city, which is surrounded by water, sinks about one centimeter every year.

The city is named after its 24-mile long tidal channel which indirectly mingles the waters of the Lagoa dos Patos and Lagoa Mirim with the Atlantic Ocean. The largest and most populous island in the Lagoa dos Patos is the Ilha dos Marinheiros, which is part of the municipality.

For the most part, Rio Grande is made up of fields of low and herbaceous vegetation, characteristic of the Uruguayan savanna. There are also planted trees, mostly eucalyptus and pine. Sand dunes are found all up and down the coastline.

The municipality contains part of the Taim Ecological Station.

Climate

The climate of Rio Grande is humid subtropical and mild, with a strong oceanic influence and relatively cool winters, warm summers and regular precipitation all year.

Sport
The two local association football clubs SC Rio Grande, Brazil's oldest active football club, and SC São Paulo, a former Serie A team, compete the derby known as Rio-Rita. Both are previous one-time state champions, in 1936 and 1933 respectively.

Sister city
 Águeda, Portugal

References

External links

 Virtual Rio Grande
 Ilha dos Marinheiros
 Rio Grande Port
 Rio Grande Federal University – FURG

Populated coastal places in Rio Grande do Sul
Populated places established in 1737
Municipalities in Rio Grande do Sul
1737 establishments in the Portuguese Empire